John Denoon (10 April 1890 – 1952) was a Scottish footballer who played in the Football League for Swansea Town.

References

1890s births
1979 deaths
Scottish footballers
Association football goalkeepers
English Football League players
Inverness Thistle F.C. players
Chelsea F.C. players
Motherwell F.C. players
Norwich City F.C. players
Queens Park Rangers F.C. players
Swansea City A.F.C. players
Mid Rhondda F.C. players